Johann Georg Büsch (January 3, 1728 at Alten-Weding in Hanover – August 5, 1800 in Hamburg) was a German mathematics teacher and writer on statistics and commerce.

Biography
He was educated at Hamburg and Göttingen, and in 1756 was made professor of mathematics in the Hamburg gymnasium, which post he held until his death. Besides suggesting many theoretical improvements in the carrying on of trade by the city, he brought about the establishment of an association for the promotion of art and industry, and the foundation of a school of trade, instituted in 1767, which became under his direction one of the most noted establishments of its class in the world. For some time before his death Büsch was almost totally blind.

As a mathematics teacher he mentored and helped the young Johann Elert Bode, who later became a famous astronomer.

Works
Besides a history of trade (Geschichte der merkwürdigsten Welthändel, Hamburg, 1781), he wrote voluminously on all subjects connected with commerce and political economy. His collected works were published in 16 volumes at Zwickau in 1813–16, and 8 volumes of selected writings, comprising those on trade alone, at Hamburg, 1824–27.

Notes

References

 

1728 births
1800 deaths
German statisticians
18th-century German educators
German activists
Writers from Hamburg
German schoolteachers